Prostration is a body gesture.

It may also refer to:
 The Prostration - a Surah of the Quran.
 Prostration of Salah - a Prayer ritual in Islam.
 Prostration of Quran recitation - a Quran recitation ritual in Islam.
 Prostration - a feeling of body tiredness.
 Prostration of angels - a gesture of Angels in Islam.
 Prostration of thanksgiving - a ritual gesture in Islam.
 Prostration in Buddhism - a ritual gesture in Buddhism.
 Prostration formula - subservient remarks to the Egyptian pharaoh.
 Nervous prostration - a mental disorder.
 Abolition of prostration - an announcement on the abolition of prostration.

See also
 Sujud (disambiguation)
 Sajda (disambiguation)
 Sajid (disambiguation)